Kpasside is a village in the Kara Region of northern Togo. 
Nearby towns and villages include Soute (4.1 nm), Wihote (3.6 nm), Pesside (3.6 nm), Baredjian (1.0 nm), Kandé (5.1 nm), Koupagou (7.2 nm) and Tantanierta (4.0 nm).

References

External links
Satellite map at Maplandia.com

Populated places in Kara Region